Tamsyn Muir (born 14 March 1985) is a New Zealand author of fantasy, science fiction and horror. Muir won the 2020 Locus Award for her first novel, Gideon the Ninth, and has been nominated for several other awards as well.

Biography
Muir was born March 14, 1985, in New South Wales, Australia. She moved to New Zealand when she was nine months old, and grew up in Howick, New Zealand. In 2010, she earned a degree in education. She is also a 2010 graduate of the Clarion Workshop. She currently lives and works in Oxford, United Kingdom. Muir is a lesbian.

Work
Muir's short story "The Deepwater Bride", published in The Magazine of Fantasy & Science Fiction in 2015, was nominated for the Nebula Award for Best Novelette, the World Fantasy Award—Short Fiction, the Eugie Award and the Shirley Jackson Award for best novelette.

Gideon the Ninth, Muir's first novel and the first book of the Locked Tomb series, was published in 2019. It was awarded the 2020 Locus Award for Best First Novel and the 2020 Crawford Award, presented annually by the International Association for the Fantastic in the Arts. It was nominated for the Nebula Award for Best Novel and the Hugo Award for Best Novel. It finished third in the Goodreads Choice Awards for best science fiction in 2019. The second book in the series, Harrow the Ninth, was published in August 2020, and was a finalist for the 2021 Hugo Award for Best Novel. It was followed by Nona the Ninth in 2022, with Alecto the Ninth forthcoming in 2023.

After the Locked Tomb books, Tor will be publishing Muir's cyberpunk western novella trilogy beginning with Go Marching In, as well as two other books.

Awards and honors 
In 2019, Amazon editors selected Gideon the Ninth as the best science fiction and fantasy book of the year. 

In 2020, Amazon named Harrow the Ninth one of the best science fiction and fantasy novels of the year.

In 2022, Kirkus Reviews named Nona the Ninth one of the best science fiction and fantasy novels of the year. Audible named the audio recording the one of the best science fiction audiobooks of the year.

Publications

The Locked Tomb

Alecto the Ninth. Tor Books. 2023.

Novellas

Short stories

Essays 

 A Little Explanation on Naming Systems (2020)

Webcomics and graphic novels
Apothecia (with Shelby Cragg) (2014)

References

External links 
 Official website
 Professional Tumblr
 Previous Tumblr (2011-2015)
 
 Tamsyn Muir at the Sci-fi Awards Database
 Tamsyn Muir on Goodreads

1985 births
Living people
New Zealand fantasy writers
New Zealand women short story writers
New Zealand women novelists
21st-century New Zealand women writers
21st-century New Zealand short story writers
21st-century New Zealand novelists
Lesbian novelists
New Zealand LGBT novelists
Women science fiction and fantasy writers